VesselSat-2 (aka Orbcomm FM43, V2) was a Luxembourgian microsatellite built and owned by LuxSpace, and operated by Orbcomm under lease. It carried a receiver for Automatic Identification System signals, used to track ships at sea. VesselSat-2 was the second of two VesselSat spacecraft (see VesselSat-1), which were built by LuxSpace for Orbcomm, as replacements for the AIS capabilities of the failed Orbcomm-QL spacecraft.

VesselSat-2 was launched as a secondary payload on a Long March 4B carrier rocket which was carrying Ziyuan 3. The launch occurred at 03:17 UTC on 9 January 2012, from Launch Complex 9 at the Taiyuan Satellite Launch Centre, and was the first orbital launch of the year.

References

External links

 https://www.webcitation.org/67w6DpNgB?url=http://luxspace.lu/index.php/News/items/the-second-luxembourg-built-satellite-vesselsat2-launched-successfully.html
 https://www.youtube.com/watch?v=-bbWD5zbYAk

Spacecraft launched in 2012